NPDPA (also known as isopropylphenidine or isophenidine) is a dissociative anesthetic that has been sold online as a designer drug. It was first identified in Germany in 2008, and while it has never been as widely sold as related compounds such as diphenidine and ephenidine, it has continued to show up in seized drug samples occasionally, and was banned in Sweden in 2015.

Metabolism
Isopropylphenidine's metabolic pathway consists of N-oxidation, N-dealkylation, mono- and bis-hydroxylation of the benzene ring, and hydroxylation of the phenyl ring only after N-dealkylation. The dihydroxy metabolites were conjugated by methylation of one hydroxy group, and hydroxy metabolites by glucuronidation or sulfation.

Legality
Sweden's public health agency suggested that NPDPA be classified as a hazardous substance on 1 June 2015. Due to that suggestion it became a scheduled substance in Sweden, as of 18 August 2015. It has also been proposed for control in Germany under analogue provisions, though these have not yet come into force as of 2016.

See also 
 AD-1211
 Fluorolintane
 Lanicemine
 Methoxphenidine (MXP)
 MT-45
 Remacemide
 UWA-001

References 

Designer drugs
Dissociative drugs
NMDA receptor antagonists
Diarylethylamines
Isopropylamino compounds